Gena may refer to:
Mareka Gena,  one of the 77 woredas in the Southern Nations, Nationalities, and Peoples' Region of Ethiopia. 
 gena, a traditional Ethiopian form of field hockey
 Gena or Lidet, the Amharic name for Christmas

People
Gena Branscombe (1881–1977), Canadian pianist, composer, music educator and choir conductor 
Gena Desouza (born 1997), Thai singer and actress
Gena Löfstrand (born 1995), South African middle-distance runner
Gena Lee Nolin (born 1971), American actress and model
Gena Rowlands (born 1930), American film, stage and television actress
Gena Showalter (born 1975), American author
Gena Turgel (1923–2018), Polish author, educator and Holocaust survivor
 Siraj Gena, Ethiopian marathon runner

Places
Alem Gena, a town in central Ethiopia

Arts and entertainment
 Gena the Crocodile, a fictional crocodile in the series of Russian animation films
Gena the Crocodile (film), Russian film

Science
 gena, the area below the compound eyes or the insect equivalent to human cheeks
 Hypatopa gena, a moth in the family Blastobasidae
Gena (crater), a tiny lunar craterlet located in the northwest part of the Mare Imbrium in the northwest of the lunar near side.

Abbreviations
 GENA, which stands for General Event Notification Architecture

See also 
 
 
Gina (disambiguation)
Genas,  a commune in the Rhône department in eastern France